Albert Edward Rowe (1872 – 16 August 1955) was an Australian politician.  He won the seat of Parramatta for the Australian Labor Party in 1929, but was defeated by Frederick Stewart in 1931.

Prior to entering politics, Rowe worked in a printing-room, as a compositor, and at the time of his election as one of the readers on the staff of The Sun. He was also a member of the board of the Printing Industry Union and the secretary of the Sylvania Progress Association. His election in 1929 was unexpected: the local newspaper wrote at the time that Parramatta had "always been looked upon as a National stronghold".

References

1872 births
1955 deaths
Members of the Australian House of Representatives
Members of the Australian House of Representatives for Parramatta
Australian Labor Party members of the Parliament of Australia
20th-century Australian politicians